Swojków may refer to the following places in Poland:
Swojków, Lower Silesian Voivodeship (south-west Poland)
Swojków, Świętokrzyskie Voivodeship (south-central Poland)